Zachrysiidae is a family of air-breathing land snails, terrestrial pulmonate gastropod mollusks in the superfamily Sagdoidea.

Genera 
 Zachrysia Pilsbry, 1894

References

External links 
 Sei, M., Robinson, R.G., Geneva, A.J. & Rosenberg, G., (2017). "Doubled helix: Sagdoidea is the overlooked sister group of Helicoidea (Mollusca: Gastropoda: Pulmonata)". Biological Journal of the Linnean Society XX: 1-32.

 
Gastropod families